Taroona Football Club is a soccer club which represents Taroona in the Tasmanian Southern Championship.

History
The first club in Taroona was Taroona Ajax, which was formed in 1972. Taroon Ajax won the Division 1 league in 1973, gaining promotion to the Premier League for 1974. They were relegated in 1974 and the club disbanded in 1976.

Afterwards, a fresh club was started for juniors called the Taroona Junior Club. In 1978, they merged with the St. Mirren Soccer Club from Lindisfarne to form the Taroona St. Mirren Soccer Club. In 1985, after the Tasmanian Soccer Association asked clubs to have one name only, the name was changed to Taroona Football Club.

Teams

Taroona Football Club fields men's and women's, youth and senior teams, across a number of divisions in Southern Tasmanian (FFT) competitions. The club's colours are black and white on their home kit and black and tangerine on their away kit.

Southern Championship Men
Southern Championship 1 Men
Southern Championship 2 Men
Women's Super League
Southern Championship Women
Southern Championship 1 Women
Southern Championship 2 Women

Season history
Men's
 Division 1: 1972–1973 Promoted to Premier 
 Premier League: 1974 Relegated and disbanded 
 Division 1: 1978–1992 Relegated to Division 3 
 Division 3: 1993 Promoted to Division 2 
 Division 2: 1994 Promoted to Division 1 
 Division 1: 1995–2006 Promoted to Premier 
 Premier League: 2007–2008 Relegated to Division 1
 Division 1: 2009 Promoted to Premier League
 Premier League: 2010 Relegated to League 1
 League 1: 2011–2012
 Southern Premier League: 2013–2014
 Southern Championship: 2015–present

Women's
 Division 1: 2007–2010 
 Southern Premier League: 2010–2014
 Southern Championship: 2015–2016
 Women's Super League: 2017–2018

League Titles: 
 Men's Division 1: 1973, 1990, 2006, 2009 
 Men's Division 3: 1993, 2020 
 Women's Division 2: 2008, 2009, 2012
 Women's Championship 1: 2018

Senior Cups: 
 Men's Division 1: Summer Cup: 1987, 1989, 1999, 2004, 2006, 2022 
 Women's Premier League: State Finals Series: 2010, 2011
 Women's Statewide Cup: 2011, 2018

References

External links
 Taroona FC website
 Taroona FC Facebook Page

Soccer clubs in Tasmania
Association football clubs established in 1978
1978 establishments in Australia